Ahmad Qasim Theeb Al-Hanandeh (born 1973) is the Jordanian Minister of Digital Economy and Entrepreneurship.

Education 
Hanandeh holds a Bachelor of Banking and Finance (1994) from the Yarmouk University.

References 

Living people
1973 births
Jordanian politicians

Yarmouk University alumni